is a beat 'em up video game released for arcades and Dreamcast in 1999. Armed with their fists, feet, and whatever weapons they should find along the way, players are tasked with ridding an unnamed city of zombies. Originally titled Blood Bullet: The House of the Dead Side Story, the game was renamed Zombies Nightmare before Sega decided on the name Zombie Revenge.

This game serves as a spin-off to Sega's popular The House of the Dead series of light gun games and contains numerous references to its parent series. A port of the game for the PlayStation 2 was to be released by Acclaim Entertainment and ported by Acclaim Studios Teesside, but was eventually canceled.

Plot and gameplay
A top-secret government plan to utilize the dead for military purposes called U.D.S., Undead Soldier is thrown into darkness by some unknown entity. A year later, the city becomes ravaged by zombies. Three of the best AMS agents are sent in: Stick Breitling, Linda Rotta and Rikiya Busujima. They are sent out to eliminate the enemy and track down the mysterious leader of this attack, known only as "Zed". After battling through the city, they eventually confront Zed, who reveals that Stick's father was involved in project U.D.S. Zed wants revenge for his parents, who were murdered as part of the project. He despises all humans and wishes to turn them all into zombies by spreading the virus. Zed unleashes a powerful U.D.S. inside of him that he calls the God of Destruction, that he plans to use to destroy the rest of the humans, before the three agents defeat him and save humanity.

Players battle zombies and bosses in each level through hand-to-hand combat, guns, or other weapons. Each player chooses one of the three characters with different attributes and various levels of proficiency in hand-to-hand combat and guns. The Dreamcast version of the game adds a Battle Mode in which two players can fight each other in one-on-one combat.

As a spin-off, the game contains various references to the original The House of the Dead game. Zombies sound and look the same as they did in the first game, and the main protagonists from both the original series and Revenge are AMS agents. At the start of the game, computer icons of Thomas Rogan and "G" can be seen on Linda's desktop. The Curien Mansion seen in the first House of the Dead appears as its own stage, called "The House of the Dead" and the music from the first stage is used. The final boss of Revenge is called Black Magician Type 01. The game's credits sequence are also similar, going back through the game's stages to the beginning of the game.

Reception

Upon release, the Dreamcast version received "mixed" reviews according to the review aggregation website Metacritic. Chris Charla of NextGen said of the game, "It looks great, it plays OK, but you'll be done with it forever in four hours. Find a video store and rent it." In Japan, Famitsu gave it a score of 32 out of 40.

Also in Japan, Game Machine listed the arcade version in their April 15, 1999 issue as being the third most-successful arcade game of the month.

Notes

References

External links

1999 video games
Arcade video games
Cancelled PlayStation 2 games
Dreamcast games
Sega arcade games
Sega beat 'em ups
Sega video games
The House of the Dead
Video games featuring female protagonists
Video game spin-offs
Video games about zombies
Multiplayer and single-player video games
3D beat 'em ups
Video games developed in Japan